was a Japanese trade union leader.

Born in Osaka, Yamagishi began working in a telegram office, and joined the Japan Telecommunications Workers' Union.  After many years active in the union, in 1982, he was elected as its president.

Yamagishi decided to focus on making international and national links between unions.  He affiliated the union to the Postal, Telegraph and Telephone International, and from 1985 served as president of the international.  In 1989, he was a leading figure in bringing together the public- and private-sector unions in Japan, forming the Japanese Trade Union Confederation (Rengo), and serving as its first president.

As the most important trade union leader in Japan, Yamagishi opposed the ruling Liberal Democratic Party, and supported Morihiro Hosokawa brief premiership.

By 1994, Yamagishi was suffering from poor health, and retired.  He died in 2016.

References

1929 births
2016 deaths
Japanese trade union leaders
People from Osaka